Velyka Lepetykha is an urban-type settlement in Kakhovka Raion, Kherson Oblast, southern Ukraine. It hosts the administration of Velyka Lepetykha settlement hromada, one of the hromadas of Ukraine.  The settlement is located on the left bank of the Kakhovka Reservoir, an artificial reservoir on the Dnieper. It has a population of

Administrative status 
Until 18 July, 2020, Velyka Lepetykha was the administrative center of Velyka Lepetykha Raion. The raion was abolished in July 2020 as part of the administrative reform of Ukraine, which reduced the number of raions of Kherson Oblast to five. The area of Velyka Lepetykha Raion was merged into Kakhovka Raion.

Economy

Transportation
Velyka Lepetykha has access to a paved road which follows the left bank of the Dnieper and connects Kakhovka with Kamianka-Dniprovska. In Kakhovka, there is access to the Highway M14, connecting Kherson with Mariupol via Melitopol. Another road leads to Henichesk via Nyzhni Sirohozy.

See also 

 Russian occupation of Kherson Oblast

References

Urban-type settlements in Kakhovka Raion
Populated places on the Dnieper in Ukraine